Leo Lankinen (Langinen) (Leo Fomich Lankinen) (13 July 1926 – 17 December 1996) was a Karelian sculptor and painter.

His last work was the Cross of Sorrow, a memorial  dedicated to Soviet and Finnish soldiers  perished in the Winter War of 1939-1940.

Awards and recognition

2006: Karelian State Prize in Arts (posthumously)
Ilya Repin State Prize
1986: Full member of the USSR Academy of Arts
1968: People's Artist of RSFSR
1967: Gold Medal of the USSR Academy of Arts, for the cycle "Мой современник" of portraits  (<Сиркка>, <Спортсмен Миша Попов>, <Комсомолка 30-х годов>, <Помор>, <Тойво Антикайнен>) 
1959: Meritorious Artist of RSFSR

The house in Petrozavodsk where he lived during 1960-1996 ( №16, ул. Куйбышева) bears a memorial plaque dedicated to him.

In 2003 a collection Скульптор Лео Ланкинен was published, of memoirs of Zurab Tsereteli, Tair Salakhov, philologist , sculptor , and others about the sculptor.

References

1926 births
1996 deaths
20th-century Russian sculptors
20th-century Russian male artists
Russian male sculptors
People from Petrozavodsk